Fangface is a 22-minute Saturday morning cartoon produced by Ruby-Spears Productions for ABC that aired from September 9, 1978, to November 11, 1979. The executive producers were Joe Ruby and Ken Spears, and this was their first cartoon they made after they left Hanna-Barbera.

Overview
Similar in format to Scooby-Doo with elements of the Tasmanian Devil and I Was a Teenage Werewolf, Fangface features four teenagers —  buff and handsome leader Biff; his brainy and beautiful girlfriend Kim; short, stocky and pugnacious Puggsy; and tall, skinny simpleton Sherman Fangsworth, who transforms into a werewolf upon seeing a full moon and back into a human whenever he sees the sun. Puggsy and Sherman are based on Leo Gorcey and Huntz Hall of the Bowery Boys films.

Cast
 Frank Welker as Fangface, Additional Voices
 Susan Blu as Kim, Additional Voices
 Bart Braverman as Pugsy, Additional Voices
 Jerry Dexter as Biff, Additional Voices

Additional
 Lewis Bailey
 Ted Cassidy
 Joan Gerber
 Henry Corden (uncredited)
 Hettie Lynn Hurtes
 Larry D. Mann
 Allan Melvin
 Alan Oppenheimer
 Michael Rye
 John Stephenson

Opening narration
The opening title narration is provided by John Stephenson, for each episode consists of the following:

 Every 400 years, a baby werewolf is born into the Fangsworth family, and so when the moon shined on little Sherman Fangsworth, he changed into Fangface, a werewolf! Only the sun can change him back to normal, and so little Fangs grew up and teamed up with three daring teenagers – Kim, Biff and Puggsy – and together they find danger, excitement and adventure! Who can save the day, who can wrong the rights and right the wrongs .... none other than Fangface!

Fangface and Fangpuss
In 1979, the second season titled Fangface and Fangpuss and introduced a new character: Baby Fangs, Fangs' infant cousin who turns into a baby werewolf called Fangpuss (which contradicts the opening narration stating that only one werewolf is born into the family every 400 years, but, of course, that werewolf could be born through another family which may be married to the Fangsworth family). The show remained in the same mystery-adventure style as the first season, but episodes were now shortened to 11-minute segments. Eight episodes of Fangface and Fangpuss were produced for the 1979 season.

The episodes The Creepy Goon from the Spooky Lagoon and Dr. Lupiter and the Thing from Jupiter are the only season two episodes in which Baby Fangs/Fangpuss did not make an appearance.

Just as Fangs is unaware that he is Fangface, Fangs is also unaware that his cousin, Baby Fangs, is Fangpuss. When Fangs sees Fangpuss, in the episode There Is Nothing Worse Than A Stony Curse, he becomes scared and runs off.

During Season 2, Fangface and Fangpuss would never see the sun, or a representation, as shown in the episode There Is Nothing Worse Than A Stony Curse, and transform back to normal before the gangs' case would be over.

Fangface and Fangpuss ran from September 22, to November 11, 1979; it then became a separate series in 1981 and, like the original Fangface, ran for just one season. After this series, Fangface and company faded into obscurity until reruns began to air on Cartoon Network and Boomerang.

Episodes

Series overview

Season 1 (1978)

Season 2 (1979)

Merchandising
 A Parker Brothers board game, titled as "FANGFACE – Parker Brothers' Wacky Werewolf Game", was released in 1979.
 Peter Pan Records released a Fangface 12-inch LP record in 1979, containing four audio stories (Side 1: Mirage / Ghost of the High Sierras; Side 2: The Stowaway / Superfrog).
 Other merchandise included an activity book, a 3D View-Master reel set, a plush toy, a Halloween costume and a sleeping bag.
 Tempo Books released two Fangface paperback books based on episodes of the series: A Heap of Trouble (1979) and A Time Machine Trip to the Pirate's Ship (1980).

Home media
 Three episodes of the series,  "A Heap of Trouble", "The Great Ape Escape", and "A Creep from the Deep", were released on a Fangface VHS by Worldvision Enterprises in 1983.
 A second VHS tape, Fangface: Spooky Spoofs, was released in 1986 and contained the episodes "The Shocking Creature Feature" and "Dinosaur Daze".

References

External links
 
 
 Fangface according to Wingnut
 Fangface at The Big Cartoon DataBase
 Fangface at The Cartoon Scrapbook

1970s American animated television series
1978 American television series debuts
1980s American animated television series
1980 American television series endings
American Broadcasting Company original programming
English-language television shows
Television series about werewolves
Television series by Ruby-Spears
Television series about shapeshifting
American children's animated action television series
American children's animated adventure television series
American children's animated fantasy television series
American children's animated horror television series
American children's animated mystery television series
Teen animated television series
Television series created by Joe Ruby
Television series created by Ken Spears